I Picked Up a Celebrity on the Street is a 2018 South Korean television series produced by YG Studioplex starring Sung Hoon, Kim Ga-eun and Kim Jong-hoon. It aired on the Oksusu mobile platform from November 1 to 30, 2018 and is available internationally on Viki.

Synopsis 
Lee Yeon-seo (Kim Ga-eun) is a contract worker for a corporation called Bonjour.  Her section chief, Mr. Nam, mistreats her, blaming her for his own mistakes (including the refusal of major K-pop celebrity Kang Joon-hyeok (Sung Hoon) to sign an endorsement deal), pawing at her, and neglecting the paperwork she needs to get paid.  Yeon-seo loses her temper at a company drinks party and in an alleyway outside the bar assaults from behind a person whom she mistakes for Nam and knocks him out cold.  She realizes that in fact she has struck Joon-hyeok.  Believing she has killed him, she manages to drag him to her apartment (with the help of some clueless police officers who think he is just her drunk boyfriend). She tries to think up ways to dispose of the body, only to discover that Joon-hyeok is alive. She decides to tie him up and keep him captive, fearing he will hand her over to the authorities. She employs her wrestling skills to keep control over Joon-hyeok and she also persuades her unemployed (and somewhat credulous) neighbor Hwang Nam-goo (Kim Jong-hoon) to help her, pretending that Joon-hyeok is her schizophrenic cousin who has delusions that he is the real Joon-hyeok because, naturally, he looks just like him.

While Joon-hyeok's manager, his rival Mir, and his girlfriend and would-be fiancée Se-ra (Park Soo-ah) wonder where he has gone and a nosy police officer and a reporter look for him, Yeon-so and Joon-hyeok settle into an uncomfortable relationship, marked mostly by moments of mistrust and occasional (and not very long-lasting) moments of rapprochement, as well as numerous comic near-misses when Yeon-seo is nearly caught. They make a deal that she will release him after three months, during which she tries various part-time jobs and then a humiliating return as a temporary worker at Bonjour, all to make enough money to be able to escape Korea. But she finds it impossible to save due to her having to pay rent, student loans and the luxury food that Joon-hyeok demands. (She doesn't ask for a ransom.) Gradually, although Joon-hyeok keeps trying to escape, the two get closer, while plots swirl around Joon-hyeok in his absence.

Cast

Main
Sung Hoon as Kang Joon-Hyeok
Kim Ga-eun as Lee Yeon-seo (child Lee Do-yeon)
Kim Jong-hoon as Hwang Nam-goo

Supporting
Kang Sung-jin as CEO Kim, head of Joon Hyeok's agency
Park Soo-ah (aka Park Soo Young) as Jin Se-ra (Joon Hyeok's girlfriend)
Han Eun Sun as Moon-hee (Yeon-seo's best friend)
Ji Ho-sung as Mir (Joon Hyeok's rival)
Yoon Kyung-ho, as Detective Byun Ji-yong 
Heo Jun-seok, Section Chief Nam, Bonjour Marketing Team] 
Jung Mi Mi as Na Ji-eun, Bonjour Marketing Team 
Hwang Jung-min as Yeon-seo's mother

Guest Roles
Park Seul-ki, Accounting department employee (Ep. 1)
Seo Beom-seok, Bonjour CEO (Ep. 1)
Lee Soo-ji, Radio talk show host (Ep. 1)
Lee Seung-chul, Drunkard in the alley (Ep. 1)
Son Young-sun, Sang Min’s grandmother (Ep.3)
Choi Dae-sung, Driving instructor (Ep. 4)
Moon Se-yun, Wrestling coach (Ep.4)
Ahn Young-mi, Joon Hyuk's fan (Ep. 4)
Kim Jin-ok, Neighbor gossiping about Nak Goo (Ep. 4)
Jeong Hee-tae, Reporter Seo (Eps. 6-7, 9)
Seo Jung-yeon, Joon Hyuk's mother (Ep. 7)
Jang Tae-min, Bonjour commercial PD (Eps. 7, 8)
Yoo Byung-jae, PD Won (SKB Broadcasting) (Ep. 8)
Jin Hyun-kwang, Reporter (Ep. 9)
Lee Joo-shil, Yoon Seo’s grandmother (Ep. 10)
Yoon Joo-man, Gangster (Ep. 10)

Sung Hoon claim for unpaid wages 
It was reported that in January 2019, according to a source at Sung Hoon’s agency Stallion Entertainment, “Sung Hoon has not been properly paid for starring in I Picked Up a Celebrity on the Street." The agency added, “The amount is 105 million won (approximately $93,600). We are currently planning to take legal action.”,

References

External links
  on Viki
 
 

2018 South Korean television seasons
2018 South Korean television series debuts
2018 South Korean television series endings
South Korean romantic comedy television series
Television series by YG Entertainment
Viki (streaming service) original programming